Lady Franklin Island (Inuktitut: Kitigtung), is an uninhabited Baffin Island offshore island located in the Arctic Archipelago in the territory of Nunavut. The island lies in Davis Strait,  from Hall Peninsula. There are at least seven smaller, unnamed islands off its northwest shore.

It was named by Arctic explorer Charles Francis Hall as a tribute to Sir John Franklin's wife Lady Franklin.

The island offers an abundance of bears, caribou (tuktoo), ducks, seals, and walrus.

References

External links
 Photos
 Lady Franklin Island in the Atlas of Canada - Toporama; Natural Resources Canada

Uninhabited islands of Qikiqtaaluk Region
Islands of Baffin Island